Tudor Hall may refer to:

Places
 Tudor Hall (Bel Air, Maryland), listed on the NRHP in Maryland
 Tudor Hall (Leonardtown, Maryland), listed on the NRHP in Maryland
 Tudor Hall (Upper Fairmount, Maryland), listed on the NRHP in Maryland

Other
 Tudor Hall (Banbury), a school in Banbury, Oxfordshire, England
 Tudor Hall School for Girls (Indianapolis, Indiana), now known as Park Tudor School

Architectural disambiguation pages